Frances Emeline Crouse (born September 21, 1995) is an American former soccer player who played as a forward for the North Carolina Courage in the National Women's Soccer League.

Early life
Crouse was born in Latrobe, Pennsylvania, to parents Samuel and Thursa Crouse. She has two other siblings: Samantha and Colby. Crouse played club soccer with Beadling Soccer Club, helping her team win three State Cup Championships and bronze medal in the US Youth Soccer National Championships in 2010.

College career
Crouse attended Penn State University, majoring in advertising and public relations. In her final year at Penn State, she was named to the MAC Hermann Trophy Watch List.

Club career

North Carolina Courage, 2018
Coming off an injury in her senior year at Penn State, Crouse was drafted 10th overall by the North Carolina Courage in the 2018 NWSL College Draft, in which she was surprised to be drafted to begin with. She obtained her first professional cap and first professional goal on June 3, 2018, against the Houston Dash. She was released by the Courage on June 15 but would continue to train with the club. On June 22, realizing NWSL rosters were locked, Crouse said, "I mean they are basically full, so I was hoping that maybe they would consider me, but if it doesn't and that was my last game I ever played in the NWSL I left on a good note. Something I'll always remember." By July, she was no longer with the team, and by January 2019, Crouse declared herself retired.

Career statistics

References

External links 
 North Carolina Courage player profile
 

1995 births
Women's association football forwards
North Carolina Courage players
Living people
National Women's Soccer League players
Soccer players from Pennsylvania
American women's soccer players
Penn State Nittany Lions women's soccer players
North Carolina Courage draft picks
People from Latrobe, Pennsylvania
Sportspeople from the Pittsburgh metropolitan area